Herold may refer to:

People
 Given name
 Herold Driedger (born 1942), Canadian politician
 Hérold Goulon (born 1988), French footballer
 Herold C. Hunt (1902–1976), American educator
 Herold Jansson (1899–1965), Danish gymnast and diver
 Herold Truffer (born 1936), Swiss ice hockey player
 Herold J. Weiler (1886–1945), United States Army officer, acting Chief of the National Guard Bureau

 Surname
 Herold (surname)

Places
 Herold, Germany
 Herold, Western Cape, South Africa
 Herold, West Virginia, United States
 Herold, Wisconsin, United States

Other uses
 Herold (beer), made in Březnice, Czech Republic
 Cyclone Herold, affecting Madagascar and the Mascarene Islands in March 2020
 Milwaukee Herold, a newspaper

See also 
 Harald (disambiguation)
 Herald (disambiguation)
 Harold (disambiguation)